William Laury Greene (October 3, 1849 – March 11, 1899) was an American Populist Party politician. He served in the United States House of Representatives from Nebraska from 1897 until his death.

Early life and career
Greene was born in Pike County, Indiana, and raised on a farm in Dubois County. He worked on the family farm while attending school, and graduated from Ireland Academy. He taught school while studying law, and attained admission to the bar in 1876. Greene practiced in Bloomington, Indiana until 1883, when he moved to Kearney, Nebraska, where he continued to practice law. Greene was active in the Baptist Church, and pastored congregations and delivered sermons at churches in Indiana.

Political career
Greene was an adherent of the Democratic Party, but was not politically active for most of his life. He was a founder of the Populist or People's Party in Nebraska during the agrarian reform and free silver movements of the late 1880s, and gained a reputation as an effective orator on behalf of Populist causes and candidates. In 1893, Greene was a candidate for the United States Senate. He lost the Fusion nomination (Populists and Democrats) to William V. Allen, who went on to win the seat.

In 1895, Greene was elected judge of Nebraska's 12th judicial district, and he served until 1897.  In 1896, Greene was elected to the United States House of Representatives as a Populist, and he served until from March 1897 his death.

Death and burial
After Congress adjourned in March 1899, Greene traveled to Lincoln, Nebraska to observe the legislative election for U.S. Senator. On March 10, he traveled from Lincoln to Omaha on business. On March 11, Greene and several friends traveled from his Omaha hotel to the train station by carriage, and upon arrival at the station, his friends observed that he was lying down on the back seat. They could not revive him, so they carried him into the train station and summoned medical aid. A doctor soon arrived, who determined that Greene had died, and the cause of death was heart failure.

Greene's funeral took place at First Baptist Church in Kearney. He was interred in Kearney Cemetery.

Family
In 1872, Greene married Emma Dowell of Shoals, Indiana. They were the parents of seven children.

See also
 List of United States Congress members who died in office (1790–1899)

References

Sources

Books

External links
 
 
 
 

1849 births
1899 deaths
19th-century American politicians
Indiana lawyers
Nebraska lawyers
Nebraska Populists
Nebraska state court judges
People from Dubois County, Indiana
People from Kearney, Nebraska
People's Party members of the United States House of Representatives from Nebraska
Politicians from Bloomington, Indiana
19th-century American judges
19th-century American lawyers
Members of the United States House of Representatives from Nebraska